6th Online Film Critics Society Awards
January 6, 2003

Best Film: 
 The Lord of the Rings:The Two Towers 
The 6th Online Film Critics Society Awards, honoring the best in filmmaking in 2002, were given on 6 January 2003.

Top 10 films
The Lord of the Rings: The Two Towers
Far from Heaven
Minority Report
Adaptation.
Gangs of New York
The Pianist
Bowling for Columbine
Punch-Drunk Love
Road to Perdition
About Schmidt

Winners and nominees

Best Picture
The Lord of the Rings: The Two Towers
Adaptation.
Bowling for Columbine
Far from Heaven
Minority Report

Best Director
Peter Jackson – The Lord of the Rings: The Two Towers
Todd Haynes – Far from Heaven
Spike Jonze – Adaptation.
Martin Scorsese – Gangs of New York
Steven Spielberg – Minority Report

Best Actor
Daniel Day-Lewis – Gangs of New York 
Adrien Brody – The Pianist
Nicolas Cage – Adaptation.
Jack Nicholson – About Schmidt
Robin Williams – One Hour Photo

Best Actress
Julianne Moore – Far from Heaven 
Jennifer Aniston – The Good Girl
Maggie Gyllenhaal – Secretary
Isabelle Huppert – The Piano Teacher
Diane Lane – Unfaithful

Best Supporting Actor
Dennis Quaid – Far from Heaven 
Alan Arkin – Thirteen Conversations About One Thing
Chris Cooper – Adaptation.
Paul Newman – Road to Perdition
Andy Serkis – The Lord of the Rings: The Two Towers

Best Supporting Actress
Samantha Morton – Minority Report
Kathy Bates – About Schmidt
Edie Falco – Sunshine State
Meryl Streep – Adaptation.
Catherine Zeta-Jones – Chicago

Best Original Screenplay
Far from Heaven – Todd HaynesFrailty – Brent Hanley
Punch-Drunk Love – Paul Thomas Anderson
Roger Dodger – Dylan Kidd
Signs – M. Night Shyamalan

Best Adapted ScreenplayAdaptation. – Charlie Kaufman and Donald KaufmanAbout Schmidt – Alexander Payne and Jim Taylor
Catch Me If You Can – Jeff Nathanson
The Lord of the Rings: The Two Towers – Fran Walsh, Philippa Boyens, Stephen Sinclair and Peter Jackson
Minority Report – Scott Frank and Jon Cohen

Best Foreign Language FilmY Tu Mamá También
Atanarjuat: The Fast Runner
Monsoon Wedding
Spirited Away
Talk to Her

Best Documentary
Bowling for Columbine
Comedian
Dogtown and Z-Boys
The Kid Stays in the Picture
Standing in the Shadows of Motown

Best Animated Feature
Spirited Away
Ice Age
Lilo & Stitch
Metropolis
Spirit: Stallion of the Cimarron

Best Cinematography
Far from Heaven – Edward LachmanGangs of New York – Michael Ballhaus
The Lord of the Rings: The Two Towers – Andrew Lesnie
Minority Report – Janusz Kamiński
Road to Perdition – Conrad L. Hall

Best EditingThe Lord of the Rings: The Two Towers – Michael Horton and Jabez OlssenAdaptation. – Eric Zumbrunnen
Chicago – Martin Walsh
Minority Report – Michael Kahn
Panic Room – James Haygood and Angus Wall

Best EnsembleThe Lord of the Rings: The Two Towers
8 Women
Adaptation.
Chicago
Gangs of New York

Best Original Score
Far from Heaven – Elmer BernsteinCatch Me If You Can – John Williams
The Lord of the Rings: The Two Towers – Howard Shore
Punch-Drunk Love – Jon Brion
Signs – James Newton Howard

Best Art DirectionFar from Heaven
Gangs of New York
The Lord of the Rings: The Two Towers
Minority Report
Road to Perdition

Best Costume Design
Far from Heaven
8 Women
Chicago
Gangs of New York
The Lord of the Rings: The Two Towers

Best Sound
The Lord of the Rings: The Two Towers
Gangs of New York
Minority Report
Signs
Star Wars: Episode II – Attack of the Clones

Best Visual Effects
The Lord of the Rings: The Two Towers
Harry Potter and the Chamber of Secrets
Minority Report
Spider-Man
Star Wars: Episode II – Attack of the Clones

Breakthrough Filmmaker
Mark Romanek – One Hour Photo
Dylan Kidd – Roger Dodger
Rob Marshall – Chicago
Bill Paxton – Frailty
Burr Steers – Igby Goes Down

Breakthrough Performer
Maggie Gyllenhaal – Secretary
Steve Coogan – 24 Hour Party People
Eminem – 8 Mile
Derek Luke – Antwone Fisher
Nia Vardalos – My Big Fat Greek Wedding

References 

2002
2002 film awards